NJ Transit Morris, Inc., formerly PABCO Transit, Inc. (doing business under the Morris County Metro brand), is a subsidiary of New Jersey Transit Corporation  based in Dover, New Jersey operating local bus services in Morris County. The company was originally called Passaic – Athena Bus Lines which operated service in Passaic and Clifton, New Jersey.

With a merger into NJ Transit in late 2010, PABCO has been renamed as NJ Transit Morris, Inc. (a subsidiary of NJ Transit), which presently operates the 871, 872, 873, 874, 875 and 880 routes at the Dover Garage on Richboynton Road with a fleet of 13 30-foot coaches.

Current routes 
Service is subsidized by the Morris County Board of Chosen Freeholders. Service operates Monday through Saturday unless noted. Routes are based from NJT Morris Garage on Richboynton Road in Dover with a central transfer hub for all routes at Morristown rail station.

Morris County Metro

Renumbered routes

In October 2010, New Jersey Transit decided to take over these routes and split them into routes 871–875 and 880 by a newly created subsidiary called NJ Transit Morris, Inc. Morris County still subsidizes their operation. These routes are part of the Central Division.

Previously discontinued routes 
On June 1, 2010 New Jersey Transit has decided to stop subsidizing the following routes leading to their discontinuation at the end of June.

Passaic-Athenia Bus Co. 
The Passaic-Athenia Bus Co. (originally Red Star Transportation up until 1922) operated the following routes before NJ Transit's takeover and contracting of the routes. The 702 was co-operated with Garfield & Passaic Transit as their #6 route and Community as its #1 route.

References

External links 
Morris County DOT
NJ Transit

Bus companies of the United States
NJ Transit Bus Operations
Transportation in Morris County, New Jersey
Surface transportation in Greater New York
Transportation companies based in New Jersey